Ffronfraith Halt railway station was a station in Llanmerewig, Powys, Wales. The station was opened on 9 July 1923 and closed on 9 February 1931. It had a short and narrow platform on the east side of the line which was constructed from stone backfilled with cinders. Access was via a sloping path that led up to a bridge that spanned the line and linked to the Kerry - Abermule road. The platform is still extant.

References

Further reading

Disused railway stations in Powys
Railway stations in Great Britain opened in 1923
Railway stations in Great Britain closed in 1931
Former Great Western Railway stations
1923 establishments in Wales